Elizabeth Reapy is an Irish writer. She won the 2017 Rooney Prize for Irish Literature.

Life
She graduated from NUI Galway, University College Cork, and Queen's University Belfast.

She edited the 2012 30 Under 30: A selection of short fiction by thirty young Irish writers.

Works
 Red Dirt, Head of Zeus 2016.

References

External links
 Book Club podcast: EM Reapy on Red Dirt
INTERVIEW Elizabeth Reapy, writer and founding editor of wordlegs.com
Irish novelist Elizabeth Reapy give her tips on writing a page-turner
E. M. Reapy debut, Red Dirt, wins Rooney Prize for Irish Literature

living people
Year of birth missing (living people)
21st-century Irish novelists
21st-century Irish women writers
Irish women novelists
Alumni of the University of Galway
Alumni of University College Cork
Alumni of Queen's University Belfast